Manégtaba-Foulbé  is a village in the Tikare Department of Bam Province in northern Burkina Faso. It has a population of 229.

References

Populated places in the Centre-Nord Region
Bam Province